The 1943 South American Championships in Athletics  were held in Santiago, Chile, between 23 April and 2 May.

Medal summary

Men's events

Women's events

Medal table

References
 Men Results – GBR Athletics
 Women Results – GBR Athletics
 Medallists

S
South American Championships in Athletics
International athletics competitions hosted by Chile
1943 in South American sport
1943 in Chilean sport